Vispop is a music genre which originated from and became popular in the Scandinavian countries in the mid-1960s. The term is derived from the word visa which denotes traditional and popular folk song of Sweden. In Norway the term applied to this type of accompanied singing is visesang. During the 1970s this was among the most popular genres of music in Scandinavia.

Characteristics
Vispop is typically performed by a singer-songwriter playing an acoustic guitar, and the lyrics often expresses social commentary. Musical groups such as the Norwegian group Ballade! also occur.

The genre could be compared to American folk rock or bluegrass.

List of notable artists

Norway
Ane Brun
Alf Cranner
Jan Eggum
Finn Kalvik
Åse Kleveland
Kristian Kristensen
Moddi
Lillebjørn Nilsen
Siri Nilsen
Øystein Sunde
Halvdan Sivertsen
Frida Ånnevik
Sweden
Lisa Ekdahl
Ted Gärdestad
Jakob Hellman
Uno Svenningsson
Cornelis Vreeswijk

See also
 Visebølgen i Norge – Referring to the music movement in Norway that started in the mid-1960s

Pop music genres
Swedish styles of music
Norwegian styles of music
Scandinavia